, a.k.a. Thomas T. Sekine was a Japanese economist and was considered to be one of the most important theorists on the field of Marx's labor theory of value. His main work The Dialectic of Capital was published in 1986. He was a scholar of Kozo Uno.

Published works

 Sekine, Thomas T.: The Dialectic of Capital. A Study of the Inner Logic of Capitalism, as Japanese title, Bumpai no Genri, 2 volumes (preliminary edition), Tokyo 1986;   (vol. 1),  (vol. 2). .
 Sekine, Thomas T.: An Outline of the Dialectic of Capital, 2 volumes, London, New York 1997; international:  (vol. 1),  (vol. 2); Nordamerika:  (vol. 1),  (vol. 2),  (set). .
 Sekine, Thomas T.: Uno-Riron: A Japanese Contribution to Marxian Political Economy, in: Journal of Economic Literature 13 (1975), pp. 847-877. .

Bibliography
 Kubota, Ken: Die dialektische Darstellung des allgemeinen Begriffs des Kapitals im Lichte der Philosophie Hegels. Zur logischen Analyse der politischen Ökonomie unter besonderer Berücksichtigung Adornos und der Forschungsergebnisse von Rubin, Backhaus, Reichelt, Uno und Sekine (PDF), in: Beiträge zur Marx-Engels-Forschung. Neue Folge 2009, pp. 199-224. .
 Kubota, Ken: The Dialectical Presentation of the General Notion of Capital in the Light of Hegel's Philosophy: On the Logical Analysis of Political Economy with Special Consideration of Adorno and the Research Results of Rubin, Backhaus, Reichelt, Uno, and Sekine (PDF), in: Revista Dialectus 9 (2020), no. 18, pp. 39-65. .
 Pack, Spencer J.: Do not dump the Unoites – Unoite school of Marxist thought in Japan. Reply to John Lie, includes John Lie's response.
 Pozo, Luis M.: Dialectics and Deconstruction in Political Economy.
 Saraka, Sean: Review of Albritton's "Dialectics and Deconstruction in Political Economy“.
 Westra, Richard: Marxian economic theory and an ontology of socialism: A Japanese intervention.

References

External links
 Thomas T. Sekine at Owl of Minerva Press
 Thomas T. Sekine, List of Publications (PDF), 2005.

Hitotsubashi University alumni
Marxian economists
Marxist theorists
Japanese economists
Japanese Marxists
1933 births
Living people
Academic staff of Aichi Gakuin University